Rebecca Shorten (born 25 November 1993) is a Northern Irish and British rower. She won a silver medal in the eight at the 2019 European Rowing Championships.
In 2021, she won a European bronze medal in the coxless four in Varese, Italy.

She has been selected for the British team to compete in the rowing events, in the coxless four for the 2020 Summer Olympics.

She won a gold medal in the coxless four at the 2022 European Rowing Championships and the 2022 World Rowing Championships.

References

External links

Rebecca Shorten at British Rowing

Living people
1993 births
British female rowers
Rowers from Northern Ireland
Rowers at the 2020 Summer Olympics
Olympic rowers of Great Britain
20th-century British women
21st-century British women
World Rowing Championships medalists for Great Britain